Cyanuric bromide is a heterocyclic compound with formula C3N3Br3. It contains a six-membered ring of alternating nitrogen and carbon atoms, with a bromine atom attached to each carbon. It is formed by the spontaneous trimerisation of cyanogen bromide.

Reactions
Cyanuric bromide can be used to synthesize substituted triazines. For example it reacts with anilines to form derivatives of melamine. With ammonia, melamine is produced. Primary or secondary amines react. Cyanuric trihydrazide is produced in the reaction with hydrazine. When heated with urea at 140 °C, ammelide is formed. 

Cyanuric bromide reacts with water, particularly in alkaline conditions to cyanuric acid and hydrogen bromide.

Cyanuric bromide can add bromine to other compound, and when it is heated with acetic acid, acetyl bromide is produced.

Formation
Cyanuric bromide can formed in a reaction with potassium ferrocyanide with bromine at 200 °C. The trimerization reaction of cyanogen bromide (BrCN) is catalyzed by aluminium trichloride or hydrogen bromide.

References

Triazines
Bromoarenes